The Worth Bingham Prize, also referred to as the Worth Bingham Prize for Investigative Reporting, is an annual journalism award which honors: "newspaper or magazine investigative reporting of stories of national significance where the public interest is being ill-served."

About the prize
The prize is named for Robert W. "Worth" Bingham, a newspaper heir and reporter who died at the age of thirty-four.  Bingham graduated from Harvard College in 1954 and served as an officer in the United States Navy.  He joined the staff of the Louisville Courier-Journal and Times in 1961, where he received a National Headliner Award for his series on "Our Costly Congress."  Before he died in 1966 in an accident on Nantucket Island, he was assistant to the publisher.

The prize is seen as a recognition of the best investigative reporting in American newspapers and newsmagazines.  The investigative reporting recognized tends to involve violations of the law, inefficiencies in government; or conflicts of interest and questions of impropriety.  The three-judge panel of the Worth Bingham Prize considers the impediments the journalist faced during his or her research, their style of writing, and the impact their piece has had on the public.  Currently, the Worth Bingham Prize judges include representatives from the Radio-Television News Directors Association, Copley News Service, The New York Times, and Bloomberg News.  The prize itself is funded through the tax-exempt Worth Bingham Memorial Fund, which is headquartered in Washington, D.C.  In order to be eligible for the prize, journalists may submit a single piece, a related number of articles, or three unrelated stories.  Columns and editorial pieces are also eligible for the prize.  The winner is presented with a trophy and US$10,000, at the Annual Awards Dinner of the National Press Foundation.

The first award was given in 1967 to William Lambert of LIFE magazine.  Notable recipients include Seymour Hersh of Dispatch News Service in 1969, for uncovering the My Lai massacre during The Vietnam War; and Bob Woodward and Carl Bernstein in 1972, for their reports on the Watergate scandal involving Richard Nixon.  Woodward won the award a second time in 1987, for his reporting on secrecy and covert action in United States foreign policy.

Recipients
 2019: Christopher Weaver, Dan Frosch, Gabe Johnson, Anna Wilde Mathews, Frank Koughan and colleagues, The Wall Street Journal and PBS's Frontline, Forsaken by the Indian Health Service.
 2018: J. David McSwane and Andrew Chavez, The Dallas Morning News, Pain and Profit.
 2017: Carol Marbin Miller and Audra D.S. Burch, Miami Herald, Fight Club.
 2016: Michael J. Berens and Patricia Callahan, Chicago Tribune, Suffering in Secret.
 2015: Cara Fitzpatrick, Lisa Gartner, Michael LaForgia, Nathaniel Lash, Dirk Shadd, Chris Davis and colleagues, Tampa Bay Times, Failure Factories.
 2014: Carol Marbin Miller, Audra D.S. Burch and colleagues, Miami Herald, Innocents Lost.
 2013: Cynthia Hubert, Phillip Reese and colleagues, The Sacramento Bee, Nevada Patient Busing.
 2012: Sam Dolnick, The New York Times, Unlocked: Inside New Jersey’s Halfway Houses.
 2011: Michael Finnegan, Gale Holland and colleagues, Los Angeles Times, Billions to Spend.
 2010: Michael J. Berens, The Seattle Times, Seniors for Sale: Exploiting the aged and frail in Washington’s adult family homes.
 2009: Raquel Rutledge, Milwaukee Journal Sentinel, Cashing in on Kids.
 2008: Jim Schaefer, M. L. Elrick, Detroit Free Press, A Mayor in Crisis.
 2007: Dana Priest, Anne Hull, The Washington Post, Walter Reed and Beyond.
 2006: Lisa Chedekel, Matthew Kauffman, Hartford Courant, Mentally Unfit, Forced to Fight.
 2005: Susan Schmidt, James V. Grimaldi, R. Jeffrey Smith, The Washington Post, Lobbying practices and influence of Jack Abramoff.
 2004: Diana B. Henriques, The New York Times, Captive Clientele – How insurance companies, investment firms and lenders have fleeced thousands of soldiers fighting for their country.
 2003: David Willman, Los Angeles Times, Stealth Merger: Drug Companies and Government Medical Research.
 2002: Staff, The Boston Globe, Abuse in the Catholic Church.
 2001: Ken Armstrong, Steve Mills, Maurice Possley, Chicago Tribune, Cops and Confessions.
 2000: Michael Grunwald, The Washington Post, Series on Army Corps of Engineers.
 1999: Choe Sang-hun, Charles J. Hanley, Martha Mendoza, Randy Herschaft, Associated Press, Series on No Gun Ri.
 1998: R. G. Dunlop, Gardiner Harris, The Courier-Journal, Dust, Deception and Death.
 1997: Douglas Frantz, The New York Times, Taxes and Tactics.
 1996: Byron Acohido, The Seattle Times, Safety at Issue: the 737.
 1995: Two winners: Jenni Bergal, Fred Schulte, Sun-Sentinel, The Medicaid HMO Game: Poor Care, Big Profits (and other related articles); and Chris Adams, Times-Picayune, profiteering of Louisiana Medicaid program.
 1994: Two winners: Jeff Brazil, Los Angeles Times, Dangerous Delays at the FAA; and Ralph Blumenthal, Douglas Frantz, The New York Times, US Air (series).
 1993: Craig Flournoy, Randy Lee Loftis, The Dallas Morning News, Race and Risk (government plans to force thousands of poor black residents to live in a Superfund toxic site).
 1992: David Boardman, Susan Gilmore, Eric Nalder, Eric Pryne, The Seattle Times, Sexual harassment investigation of U.S. Senator Brock Adams.
 1991: Richard Behar, Time magazine, Scientology: The Cult of Greed.
 1990: Keith McKnight, Bob Paynter, Andrew Zajac, Akron Beacon Journal, Secret campaign contributions in Ohio politics.
 1989: Jenni Bergal, Fred Schulte, Fort Lauderdale News and Sun-Sentinel, Crisis in Care: How HRS Fails Florida.
 1988: Bill Dedman, The Atlanta Journal-Constitution, The Color of Money: lending practices discriminate against blacks.
 1987: Staff and editors, Newsday, The Rush to Burn: America’s Garbage Gamble.
 1986: Bob Woodward, The Washington Post, Secrecy in Government (Reagan administration).
 1985: David Ashenfelter, Laura Berman, Tom Hundley, Larry Kostecke, Michael Wagner, Detroit Free Press, Series questioning Michigan Corrections Department’s practices on prisoner release.
 1984: Two winners: Brooks Jackson, David Rogers, The Wall Street Journal, Money and Politics; and Chris Collins, John Hanchette, Gannett News Service, The Vaccine Machine.
 1983: Dennis Camire, Mark Rohner, Sharon Johnson, Gannett News Service, Series investigating fraud and mismanagement in the U.S. Department of Agriculture’s Farmers Home Administration (FmHA).
 1982: Alan Green, Bill Hogan, Diane Kiesel, The New Republic, The New Slush Fund Scandal: How congressmen live high on campaign money.
 1981: Patrick Oster, Bruce Ingersoll, Chicago Sun-Times, Defense Dilemmas.
 1980: Two winners: Ralph Soda, Gannett Papers, Series on an attempt by two brothers to corner the world’s silver market; Ted Gup, Jonathan Neumann, The Washington Post, Series exposing how companies bribed federal government officials for lucrative government consulting contracts.
 1979: John Fialka, The Washington Star, Nifty Nugget: series on U.S. military shortcomings as revealed by a secret military exercise in Europe.
 1978: David Hess, Akron Beacon Journal, A body of work on problems with Firestone’s steel-belted radial tires.
 1977: Michael J. Sniffen, Richard E. Meyer, The Associated Press, Bert Lance used the same stock as collateral for two different loans.
 1976: Morton Mintz, The Washington Post, The Medicine Business (series): Why pharmaceutical disasters continue to occur.
 1975: James V. Risser, The Des Moines Register, Corruption in the grain-exporting business.
 1974: Maxine Cheshire, The Washington Post, Series on whereabouts of state gifts to U.S. officials and their families from foreign leaders and dignitaries.
 1973: Jerry Landauer, The Wall Street Journal, Spiro Agnew series.
 1972: Carl Bernstein, Bob Woodward, The Washington Post, bugging of Democratic National Headquarters at the Watergate.
 1971: Frank Wright, Minneapolis Star Tribune, How dairy lobby applied financial weight to secure a favorable decision on price supports; implications in political process.
 1970: James Clayton, The Washington Post, Series of editorials criticizing President Nixon’s nominee to the Supreme Court, G. Harrold Carswell.
 1969: Seymour Hersh, Dispatch News Service, My Lai 4 incident (series).
 1968: Special Assignment Team, The Associated Press, Collection of reports on various ways the federal government wasted taxpayers’ money.
 1967: William Lambert, Life magazine, Senator Edward Long’s Help-Hoffa campaign.

See also

Barry Bingham, Sr., father of Worth Bingham
Robert Worth Bingham, Worth's grandfather and namesake

References

Further reading

External links
Official site
Winners

American journalism awards
Awards established in 1967
1967 establishments in the United States
Bingham family